John "Willy" Williams (born 8 October 1988) is a former Australian rules footballer who played for the Essendon Football Club in the Australian Football League (AFL).  Williams was educated at Brisbane Grammar School and then at the University of Queensland where he learned the game after joining the University of Queensland Australian Football Club. After successful seasons in the Under 18 and Senior sides at UQ he moved to the Morningside Australian Football Club for a season (which included an appearance in the Queensland Under 21 representative side) before being drafted to Essendon. Williams spent most of his time with Essendon playing for their VFL-affiliate, the Bendigo Bombers.  He made his debut in the final game of the 2008 season. After playing one senior match in four seasons, Williams was delisted by Essendon at the end of 2010.

References

External links 
John William's profile on essendonfc.com.au

Australian rules footballers from Queensland
Essendon Football Club players
Morningside Australian Football Club players
1988 births
Living people
Bendigo Football Club players